Petershill Football Club are a Scottish football club from Springburn in the north of Glasgow. Nicknamed the Peasy, they were formed in 1897 and are traditionally one of the stronger clubs at their level, although they have not been as successful in recent years as they have been historically.

They play at New Petershill Park: a modern stadium with a capacity of 2,000 including a 562 all-seated stand. The colours of their strip are maroon and white.

An unrelated senior club also named Petershill operated in Springburn between 1877 and 1883 and participated in the early Scottish Cup seasons, before merging with Northern; the year of Northern's subsequent dissolution was 1897, the same as the formation of Petershill, albeit the club history does not mention any link to Northern, nor to Cowlairs, another former SFL team in Springburn which had folded in 1896.

The club share a healthy rivalry with Maryhill.

Honours
Scottish Junior Cup
Winners: 1911–12, 1915–16, 1917–18, 1950–51, 1955–56
Runners-up: 1910–11, 1934–35, 1948–49, 1984–85

West of Scotland League
Conference C winners: 2021–22

Other Honours
West of Scotland Cup winners: 1951–52, 1957–58, 1968–69, 1995–96, 2006–07
Central League champions: 1932–33, 1938–39, 1939–40, 1951–52, 1955–56, 1963–64, 1968–69
Central League A Division winners: 1968–69
Central League Premier Division winners: 1982–83, 1983–84, 1989–90, 1992–93
Glasgow Junior Cup: 1903–04, 1912–13, 1933–34, 1943–44, 1949–50, 1954–55, 1960–61, 1964–65
Glasgow Dryburgh Cup: 1950–51, 1951–52, 1964–65
Central League Cup: 1973–74, 1974–75, 1991–92, 2009–10
Central (Beatons Coaches) Sectional League Cup: 1977–78, 1981–82, 1994–95
Evening Times Cup Winners Cup: 1991–92

Former players

1. Players that have played/managed in the Scottish Football League or any foreign equivalent to this level (i.e. fully professional league).
2. Players with full international caps.
3. Players that hold a club record or have captained the club.
 Torrance Gillick
 James Greechan
 Alex Massie
 John McKenzie
 Benny Rooney
 Ryan Scully

References

External links
 

 
Football clubs in Scotland
Scottish Junior Football Association clubs
Association football clubs established in 1897
Football clubs in Glasgow
1897 establishments in Scotland
Springburn
West of Scotland Football League teams